Hatzfeld (Eder) is a small town in Waldeck-Frankenberg district in Hesse, Germany.

Geography

Location
Hatzfeld lies in west Hesse 25 km northwest of Marburg and north of the Sackpfeife (674 m-high mountain) in the valley of the Eder.

Neighbouring communities
Hatzfeld borders in the north and east on the town of Battenberg (Waldeck-Frankenberg), in the south on the town of Biedenkopf (Marburg-Biedenkopf), and in the west on the town of Bad Berleburg (Siegen-Wittgenstein in North Rhine-Westphalia).

Constituent communities
The town of Hatzfeld consists of the centres of Biebighausen, Eifa, Hatzfeld (main town), Holzhausen, Lindenhof and Reddighausen

History
Hatzfeld had its first documentary mention in 1138. In 1340, the community was granted town rights. After the Hatzfeld branch of the House of Hatzfeld died out in 1570, half the town, and later the whole, passed to the County of Hesse. In 1866, Hatzfeld passed to Prussia, and under Prussian law lost its town rights in 1885. After Prussia was dissolved, Hatzfeld once again became a town in 1950.

Reddighausen
Reddighausen, nowadays one of Hatzfeld's constituent communities, had its first documentary mention in 1278, at that time still under the name Redinchusen. Already by 1840 Reddighausen had 474 inhabitants; nowadays (as of 2000) there are roughly 900.

Lindenhof
Lindenhof is a hamlet and one of Hatzfeld's constituent communities. Its name, unlike what might be assumed, has nothing to do with linden trees, even though there is a "namesake" tree growing in the community ("Linden" is Linde – plural, Linden – in German), but rather with linen (Leinen), which in earlier times was woven here. In 1993, Lindenhof celebrated 300 years of existence, even though various sources point to a greater age.

What is known is that in 1693, a Hatzfeld townsman named Eckhardt went into the lovely dale here and acquired a newly built agricultural estate. In 1712, there were already six households in Lindenhof. In 1892, the hamlet got its own schoolteacher, who taught in a private house. In 1895, there were 77 people living in Lindenhof. In 1939, Lindenhof got its own school, which lasted until 1965 when its functions were transferred to a new central school in Hatzfeld.

By the beginning of the First World War, 21 residential buildings had appeared in the dale, although some of them were in the separate hamlet of Hof Roda.

In 1991-1992, what is arguably Hesse's smallest half-timbered church was consecrated in Lindenhof.

Photograph gallery

Politics

Town council

The town council's 23 seats are apportioned thus, in accordance with municipal elections held on 26 March 2006:

Note: The Bürgerlisten are "citizens' lists" rather than actual parties.

Coat of arms
The current civic coat of arms was conferred in 1950, but the charges shown within it date back to the 14th century, from which time an old town seal is known. The arms show a town wall with a gateway flanked by towers. Also in the arms above the gateway is an inescutcheon showing the arms of the Lords (later also Counts and Princes) of Hatzfeld, who died out in 1570. The size and shape of the various charges in the arms have changed over the ages.

Town partnerships
Hatzfeld maintains partnership links with the following:
  Cloyes-sur-le-Loir, département of Eure-et-Loir, France since 1979

Sport and leisure
Tourism plays an important rôle in Reddighausen, which is a state-recognized resort with a comprehensive network of hiking trails. There is also a combination woodlore and bird-protection path in Hatzfeld (main town), and at the Sackpfeife are found a winter sport centre, and also a summer toboggan run.

In Lindenhof is a wildfowl haven run by the Naturschutzbund Deutschland, a non-governmental organization dedicated to nature conservation.

Churches
Evangelical-Lutheran Church

Literature
 H. Reimer: Historisches Ortslexikon für Kurhessen; Marburg: Elwert, 1974; ; S.304

References

External links
Reddighausen
Verein für Burg- und Heimat- geschichte Hatzfeld e.V.

Waldeck-Frankenberg